Scott Russell may refer to:

 John Scott Russell (1808–1882), known as J. Scott Russell, Scottish naval engineer
 Scott Russell (athlete) (born 1979), male javelin thrower 
 Scott Russell (motorcyclist) (born 1964), American motorcycle road racer
 Scott Russell (commentator) (born 1958), commentator for CBC, Hockey Night in Canada and figure skating
 Scott Russell (footballer) (born 1970), Australian football player
 Scott Russell (tenor) (1868–1949), English singer, actor and theatre manager

See also
 Russell Scott (1921–2012), American clown
 Scott Russell linkage, converts linear motion, to (almost) linear motion in a line perpendicular to the input